Seckel syndrome, or microcephalic primordial dwarfism (also known as bird-headed dwarfism, Harper's syndrome, Virchow–Seckel dwarfism and bird-headed dwarf of Seckel) is an extremely rare congenital nanosomic disorder. Inheritance is autosomal recessive. It is characterized by intrauterine growth restriction and postnatal dwarfism with a small head, narrow bird-like face with a beak-like nose, large eyes with down-slanting palpebral fissures, receding mandible and intellectual disability.

A mouse model has been developed. This mouse model is characterized by a severe deficiency of ATR protein. These mice have high levels of replicative stress and DNA damage. Adult Seckel mice display accelerated ageing. These findings are consistent with the DNA damage theory of aging.

Symptoms and signs
Symptoms include:
 intellectual disability (more than half of the patients have an IQ below 50)
 microcephaly
 sometimes pancytopenia (low blood counts)
 cryptorchidism in males
 low birth weight
 dislocations of pelvis and elbow
 unusually large eyes
 blindness or visual impairment 
 large, low-set ears
 small chin due to receded lower jaw

Genetics
It is believed to be caused by defects of genes on chromosome 3 and 18. One form of Seckel syndrome can be caused by mutation in the gene encoding the ataxia telangiectasia and Rad3-related protein which maps to chromosome 3q22.1-q24. This gene is central in the cell's DNA damage response and repair mechanism.

Types include:

Diagnosis

Treatment

History 
The syndrome was named after German-American physician Helmut Paul George Seckel (1900–1960). The synonym Harper's syndrome was named after Rita G. Harper.

See also 
 Koo-Koo the Bird Girl

References

External links 
 

Congenital disorders
Growth disorders
Syndromes affecting head size
Syndromes affecting stature
Syndromes with intellectual disability
Rare syndromes